Baird Bay Islands Conservation Park is a protected area in the Australian state of South Australia associated with two islands located in Baird Bay on the west coast of Eyre Peninsula respectively about  and  west south-west of Streaky Bay.

The islands are respectively an unnamed island within Baird Bay and Jones Island, and each first obtained protected area status as a fauna conservation reserve declared under the Crown Lands Act 1929-1966 on 16 March 1967.  On 27 April 1972, the land under protection was reconstituted as the Baird Bay Islands Conservation Park upon the proclamation of the National Parks and Wildlife Act 1972.

In 1980, the conservation park was described as follows:
Two low flat limestone islands. The unnamed island in Baird Bay (section 181) is connected to the mainland at low tide and features a largely introduced flora. Jones Island off the mouth of Baird Bay retains its natural vegetation. Islands dedicated as a park primarily to preserve the breeding habitat of sea-birds including the uncommon osprey, pelicans, sooty oyster catchers and crested terns.  A colony of Australian sea-lions also utilises Jones Island. Jones Island is in good condition in the absence of introduced species and retains considerable conservation importance. The unnamed island in Baird Bay is degraded.

The conservation park is classified as an IUCN Category IV protected area. In 1980, the conservation park was listed on the former Register of the National Estate.

References

External links
Baird Bay Islands Conservation Park webpage on the Protected Planet website

Conservation parks of South Australia
Protected areas established in 1967
1967 establishments in Australia
South Australian places listed on the defunct Register of the National Estate
Eyre Peninsula